Brown County is a county in Indiana which in 2010 had a population of 15,242. The county seat (and only incorporated town) is Nashville.

History

The United States acquired the land from the Native Americans, part of which forms the southwest section of what is now Brown County, in the 1809 treaty of Fort Wayne. By the treaty of St. Mary's in 1818 considerably more territory became property of the government and this included the future Brown County area. No settler was allowed in the area until the government survey was completed in 1820. The first white man known to arrive was a German, Johann Schoonover, who lived for a short time on the creek later named for him to trade with the Native Americans, about 1820. In that same year William Elkins, the first pioneer, built a log cabin and cleared land in the area. In the 1850s Elkins was recorded as having settled in the future Van Buren Township, and the settlement that grew up around him was known as Elkinsville.

The earliest pioneers came from Kentucky, Tennessee, Virginia, and the Carolinas. They crossed the Ohio River and traveled north on narrow Indian trails through dense hardwood forest with wagons drawn by oxen. Many made their way to Bloomington, then east to hilly country, or they reached Jackson County and came north into future Brown County on the Sparks Ferry Road, or west from Columbus in Bartholomew County. Pioneers who had settled on lowland near Columbus came to the hills to escape malaria. Others deliberately chose the hills having lived in mountains before they made the trip to Indiana in search of new land. By 1830 an estimated 150 settlers had arrived; the United States census of 1840 reported 2,364 people. 

By 1828 the Indiana State Legislature had divided the land of present-day Brown County between Monroe, Jackson, and Bartholomew counties. In 1835 settlers presented a petition to the Legislature requesting a new county. On February 4, 1836, both the House and Senate passed a bill providing for the formation from western Bartholomew, eastern Monroe, and northern Jackson counties of a county to be named for Gen. Jacob Brown, who defeated the British at the Battle of Sackett's Harbor in the War of 1812.

In August 1836, the land was divided into five townships of Jackson, Hamblen, Washington, Johnson, and Van Buren. Nashville, then known as Jacksonburg, was chosen as the county seat. Banner C. Brummett was appointed County Agent to lay out Nashville in lots to be sold at auction. It was expected that money from the sale would help pay expenses of the county government. The lots sold very slowly, for pioneers had little money, and funds were short for a number of years. In 1837 a log court house and jail were built. They were built on the same lots on which the present court house and log jail stand. Nashville, at that time, consisted of a cluster of log cabins and 75 people.

The country was wild in 1836; bears, panthers, and wolves were plentiful. The wolves were so numerous that the Commissioners paid $1 for every wolf pelt brought to them. Settlers lived a rugged pioneer type of life for many years. Their cabins and small settlements were mere niches in the great forest that covered hills and valleys.

By the time Nashville was incorporated in 1872, water-powered grist mills and sawmills were scattered over the county. Each village served its own locality with at least one general store, a blacksmith shop, a church and a post office. A doctor, sometimes more than one, lived in almost every village. In 1881 there were 20 doctors in the county, and 37 churches - Methodist, United Brethren, Baptist, Christian, Presbyterian, and New Light. There were many immigrants in Brown County at this time, including immigrants from England, Wales, Germany and elsewhere. Two of the Presbyterian churches in the county had congregations that consisted entirely of Presbyterians of Scottish descent who came to America from County Down and County Antrim in the northeastern part of Ireland, in what has since become Northern Ireland. These immigrants were referred to by the rest of the community as being "Scots-Irish", however they referred to themselves as "Ulstermen" and "Irish Presbyterians". Money continued to be scarce and much business was conducted by the barter system. The first schools were built of logs, but by 1872 one-room frame school houses dotted the county; in 1900 there were 73.

People farmed but they depended on forest products for cash. Lumber was taken to Indianapolis, also tan bark, cross ties, hoop poles, and barrel staves. The trees were cut recklessly and this led to deep trouble. Since there was not enough farm land on the ridge tops and in the creek bottoms, trees were eliminated on the sides of hills. Wheat and other crops were planted, and erosion became a significant problem. By 1900, soil was so completely washed from hillsides and creek bottoms that crops could not be grown. Poverty was widespread and people began to leave the county in droves. Cabins all over the hills and valleys stood empty. In 1890, 10,308 people lived in Brown County. By 1930 only 5,168 remained. Not until 1980 did the population exceed the 1890 figure.

In 1900, villages were still the centers of Brown County life. Travel by horseback, wagon, or carriage was exceedingly limited due to deeply rutted, rocky roads. There were people in remote areas who never made a trip to Nashville during their lives. Many a family's only contact with the outside world was a salesman's weekly visit with his horse and wagon. As a result, the pioneer way of life continued long after other counties had adopted a new pattern of living.

In 1905 the Illinois Central Railroad built a line from Indianapolis to Effingham, Illinois. The line ran from Morgantown across the southwest corner of Jackson Township. Helmsburg was the main station. Two trains a day from Indianapolis, and two from Effingham, brought freight, mail, and passengers. Horse drawn hacks took people and wagons transported mail and freight from the station to Nashville.

The first cars appeared in Nashville in 1913. Their use was strictly limited because of the poor roads and because of the widespread belief, peculiar to Brown County, that cars were both autonomous and maleficent. By necessity as the number of cars increased, county roads were gradually improved. By 1934 State Road 135 north from Nashville to Morgantown had been built and in that year was hardsurfaced. State Road 46 between Bloomington and Nashville was worked on extensively until it was considered one of the best gravel roads in the state. Some years later it was hard surfaced.

In 1907, artist T. C. Steele built a studio near Belmont in rural Brown County and Adolph Shulz came to Nashville and thus began the Brown County Art Colony. Will Vawter, V.J. Cariani, Marie Goth, C. Curry Bohn, Dale Bessire and others moved to Nashville. The Brown County Art Gallery was opened in 1926. In 1954 a larger gallery was built on East Main Street, and an Art Guild established a gallery in the old Minor House on Van Buren Street. Nashville continues to be an art center and tourist attraction.

Brown County State Park opened in 1931 offering many advantages: a lodge, cabins for rent, picnic areas, a swimming pool, and miles of trails. And at present there is Yellowwood State Forest, the Hoosier National Forest, Lake Monroe and Lake Lemon.

Geography
Unlike much of Indiana with its low rolling hills, the terrain of Brown County is rugged and hilly, with the drainage areas filled with brush, undergrowth, or trees. The county's highest point ( ASL) is Weed Patch Hill, the third-highest prominence in the state.

Brown County is tied with Benton County as the least densely populated county in Indiana. Brown County has by far the highest concentration of forested land of any of Indiana's 92 counties with nearly 90% coverage and almost no large farms at all.

Adjacent counties

 Johnson County - northeast
 Bartholomew County - east
 Jackson County - south
 Monroe County - west
 Morgan County - northwest

Incorporated community 
 Nashville (county seat)

Unincorporated communities 

 Bean Blossom
 Belmont
 Camp Roberts
 Christiansburg
 Clarksdale
 Cornelius
 Elkinsville
 Fruitdale
 Gatesville
 Gnaw Bone
 Helmsburg
 Lanam
 Mount Liberty
 Needmore
 Pikes Peak
 Spearsville
 Stone Head
 Story
 Taggart
 Trevlac
 Waycross

Former communities 
Oak Grove

Dollsberry
 Beck
 Beveridge
 Buffalo
 Cleona
 Cooper
 Gent
 Kelp
 Lock
 Marble
 Marshall
 Ramelton
 Sherman
 Youno
Sources:

Townships
 Hamblen
 Jackson
 Van Buren
 Washington

Census-designated place
 Cordry Sweetwater Lakes

Major highways
  Indiana State Road 45
  Indiana State Road 46
  Indiana State Road 135

Protected areas
 Brown County State Park Brown County State Park
 Cordry Sweetwater Conservancy District
 Hoosier National Forest (part)
 T. C. Steele State Historic Site
 Yellowwood State Forest

Lakes
 Lake Lemon
 Monroe Lake

Climate and weather

Government

The county government is a constitutional body, and is granted specific powers by the Constitution of Indiana, and by the Indiana Code.

County Council: The legislative branch of the county government; controls spending and revenue collection in the county. Representatives are elected to four-year terms from county districts. They set salaries, the annual budget, and special spending. The council has limited authority to impose local taxes, in the form of an income and property tax that is subject to state level approval, excise taxes, and service taxes.

Board of Commissioners: The executive body of the county. Commissioners are elected county-wide to staggered four-year terms. One commissioner serves as president. The commissioners execute acts legislated by the council, collect revenue, and manage the county government.

Court: The county maintains a circuit court with jurisdiction to hear civil and criminal cases. The judge on the court is elected to a term of six years and must be an attorney licensed to practice in Indiana. The judge is assisted by a magistrate who is hired by the circuit court judge, not elected.

County Officials: The county has other elected offices, including sheriff, coroner, auditor, treasurer, recorder, surveyor, and circuit court clerk. These officers are elected to four-year terms.

Brown County is part of Indiana's 9th congressional district, Indiana Senate district 40 and Indiana House of Representatives districts 60 and 65.

Demographics

2010 Census
As of the 2010 United States Census, there were 15,242 people, 6,199 households, and 4,444 families in the county. The racial makeup of the county was 97.6% white, 0.3% Asian, 0.3% American Indian, 0.3% black or African American, 0.3% from other races, and 1.1% from two or more races. Those of Hispanic or Latino origin made up 1.2% of the population. In terms of ancestry, 27.2% were German, 13.1% were Irish, 11.6% were English, and 11.3% were American. Those citing "American" ancestry in Brown County are of overwhelmingly English extraction, however most English Americans identify simply as having American ancestry because their roots have been in North America for so long, in some cases since the 1600s.

Of the 6,199 households, 26.8% had children under the age of 18 living with them, 60.2% were married couples living together, 7.2% had a female householder with no husband present, 28.3% were non-families, and 23.6% of all households were made up of individuals. The average household size was 2.43 and the average family size was 2.85. The median age was 46.7 years.

The median income for a household in the county was $47,697 and the median income for a family was $56,911. Males had a median income of $42,269 versus $30,175 for females. The per capita income for the county was $24,312. About 9.0% of families and 10.8% of the population were below the poverty line, including 17.2% of those under age 18 and 6.5% of those age 65 or over.

2020 census

See also
 National Register of Historic Places listings in Brown County, Indiana

References

External links
 Annual Brown County Studio Tour 2012
 Brown County Democrat newspaper
 Brown County Convention & Visitors Bureau
 Brown County Chamber of Commerce
 Brown County, Indiana: A Beautiful Place to Live, Work or Visit, an Ebook by Brown Countian Brown County, Indiana: A Beautiful Place 
 Foxfire Park  Foxfire Park in Nashville hosts annual Fall Fine Arts Festival.
 Town of Nashville
 The Artists of Brown County
 The Hohenberger Photograph Collection consists of about 15,000 photographs and negatives of Brown County, Indiana, by photographer Frank Michael Hohenberger, 1876–1963.

 
Indiana counties
1836 establishments in Indiana
Populated places established in 1836
Sundown towns in Indiana